The 1888–89 season was Burslem Port Vale's first season and only season of football in The Combination. The league was abandoned before the fixture list was completed, though Vale were in poor form regardless. They exited the FA Cup, Staffordshire Senior Cup and North Staffordshire Challenge Cup in their opening rounds and also struggled in friendlies, the low point being a 3–1 defeat to village team Oswaldtwistle Rovers at the Athletic Ground.

Overview

The Combination
Burslem Port Vale prepared for their first ever league campaign by signings Lewis Ballham from Stoke and Dick Danks from Wolverhampton Wanderers, though they lost Harry Cookson to South Shore and Bob Ramsay to Stoke. Despite being overweight, forward Billy Reynolds scored the winning goal in the season opening victory over Birmingham St George's at the Athletic Ground. Though they lost 2–1 at home to Halliwell, they recorded 6–1 and 3–0 home victories over Gainsborough Trinity and South Shore. However a sequence of away fixtures followed, in which they picked two points on the road all season. Their home form remained steady though, picking up 16 of a possible 26 points at home.

Cup competitions and friendlies
Vale's interest in the FA Cup ended early as they were beaten 3–2 at Small Heath Alliance. Their friendlies in the first part of the season were also largely disappointing, losing 4–0 to Preston North End and 8–1 to Blackburn Rovers – both strong sides – but more worryingly they were humbled 4–0 at little-known side Witton. A 3–1 home defeat to Lancashire village team Oswaldtwistle Rovers on 12 January was embarrassing, one of the worst results in the club's short history as they proved themselves "not worthy of a club their standing" on the day. On 16 February, they fell to a 5–1 defeat at home to Potteries derby rivals Stoke in front of a season-high crowd of 5,000. They managed to beat Burton Wanderers 4–2 in the fourth round of the Staffordshire Senior Cup on 9 March, but were forced to replay the game after the visitors complained about the state of the Athletic Ground pitch; the replay was lost 3–1 as the team reverted to "the old game of a long kick and a sharp rush".

Desperate to turn around their poor form, the club signed "the best centre-forward that ever left Scotland" in 19-year old Frank McGinnes, who had built up a formidable reputation at Halliwell. They travelled to Anfield on 20 April and recorded a 1–0 victory over Everton, but the season petered out with defeat to Leek in the semi-finals of the North Staffordshire Challenge Cup and a 7–1 thumping after fielding a weakened side at Bootle. The Combination league collapsed, but the team's poor form meant they were not invited to compete in either the new Football Alliance. The club management resolved to strengthen the team and had to be content with friendlies for the following campaign.

Results
Burslem Port Vale's score comes first

Legend

The Combination

FA Cup

Staffordshire Senior Cup

North Staffordshire Challenge Cup

Friendlies

Player statistics

Appearances

Top scorers

Transfers

Transfers in

Transfers out

References
Specific

General

Port Vale F.C. seasons
Burslem Port Vale